Ryūji Miura (三浦龍司, Miura Ryūji, born 11 February 2002) is a Japanese long-distance runner.

Career
A student at Juntendo University, in 2019 as a 17 year old at the Kinki Region High School Track and Field Championships broke the 30-year-old Japanese 3000m steeplechase high school record by 5 seconds to win in 8:39.49. He missed the 2020 national championship due to injury but prior to that beat Philemon Kiplagat to win the 3000m at the Hokuren Distance Challenge at Aoba Park Athletic Field, Chitose in 8:19:37, which was the world leading time, and ultimately was the 8th fastest time in the world in 2020, and the second best time ever by a Japanese runner over that distance.

Miura won the 3000m steeplechase at the Ready Steady Go event at the Olympic Stadium, Tokyo on the 9 May 2021. Miura's winning time of 8:17:46 took more than a second off the national record of 8:18.93 set by Yoshitaka Iwamizu at the 2003 World Championships in Athletics in Paris. It was an Olympic qualifying mark, and well inside his 2020 personal best of 8:19.37. In running this time, he became the first man to break a national record at the new stadium in Tokyo.

On 26 June 2021, Miura set a new national record of 8:15.99 at Yanmar Stadium Nagai, Osaka. He later bested this national record at the 2020 Olympic Games with a time of 8:09.92.

Personal bests
Outdoor
1500 metres – 3:36.59(2022)
5000 metres – 13:26.78 (Kitami 2021)
3000 metres steeplechase – 8:09.92 (Tokyo 2021) NR
Half marathon – 1:01:41 (Tachikawa 2020)

References

2002 births
Living people
Japanese male steeplechase runners
Athletes (track and field) at the 2020 Summer Olympics
Olympic athletes of Japan
21st-century Japanese people